This is the discography for Canadian electronic music producer Datsik.

Studio albums

Extended plays

Singles

Remixes

2009 
 Wu-Tang Clan — "Biochemical Equation" (Datsik & Excision Remix)
 Ctrl Z vs. Freestylers featuring Navigator — "Ruffneck '09" (Excision & Datsik Remix)
 Ivory — "Hand Grenade" (Excision & Datsik Dubstep Remix)
 Nobuo Uematsu — "Jenova Project" (Datsik Remix)

2010 
Apex — "Nowhere to Run" (Datsik & Excision Remix)
 The Crystal Method featuring LMFAO — "Sine Language" (Datsik Remix)
 Don Diablo featuring Dragonette — "Animale" (Datsik Remix)
 Diplo featuring Lil Jon — "U Don't Like Me" (Datsik Remix)
 Noisia — "Alpha Centauri" (Excision & Datsik Remix)
 Kelly Dean & Steady featuring Kemst — "Teflon" (Excision & Datsik Remix)
 Coldplay — "Fix You" (Datsik Remix)
 MGMT — "Kids" (Datsik Remix)
 Lil Wayne — "A Milli" (Excision & Datsik Remix)

2011 
 Bassnectar — "Boombox" (Datsik Remix)
 Steve Aoki & Sidney Samson — "Wake Up Call" (Datsik Remix)

2012 
 Foreign Beggars featuring Black Sun Empire — "Solace One" (Datsik Remix)
 Zedd — "Stars Come Out" (Datsik Remix)
 Kaskade & Skrillex — "Lick It" (Datsik Remix)
 DJ Fresh featuring Dizzee Rascal — "The Power" (Datsik Remix)
 Dada Life — "Kick Out The Epic Motherf***er" (Datsik Remix)
 Colin Munroe featuring K.Flay - "Your Eyes" (Datsik Remix)

2013 
 Linkin Park — "Until It Breaks" (Datsik Remix)
 Example — "Perfect Replacement" (Datsik Remix)
 Pretty Lights featuring Talib Kweli — "Around the Block" (Datsik Remix)
 Doctor P & Adam F featuring Method Man - "The Pit" (Datsik Remix)

2014 
 Excision & Far Too Loud — "Destroid 8 Annihilate" (Datsik Remix)
 Lana Del Rey — "Ultraviolence" (Datsik Remix)

Appears On

 An-Ten-Nae Presents: Acid Crunk Vol. 2 (Muti Music, October 26, 2009)
 Downlink — Ignition EP (Rottun Recordings, November 18, 2009)
 Elite Force — Revamped (U&A Recordings, March 8, 2010)
 Skins (2011)
 Chaosphere — Eradicate EP (Rottun Recordings, May 16, 2011)
 No Strings Attached EP (Circus Records, August 15, 2011)
 deadmau5 — Meowingtons Hax Tour Trax (Mau5trap, August 25, 2011)
 Excision — X Rated (Mau5trap, September 12, 2011)
 Subvert — Crazy EP (Rottun Recordings, October 3, 2011)
 Korn — The Path of Totality (Roadrunner Records, December 6, 2011)
 Diplo — Express Yourself EP (Mad Decent, June 12, 2012)
Truth — Evil In The Woods EP (Smog, November 20, 2012)
 Saints Row IV (2013)
 Getter — I Want More LP (Firepower Records, February 5, 2013)
 Protohype — Speak No Evil EP (Firepower Records, October 22, 2013)
 Linkin Park — Recharged (Warner Bros. Records, October 29, 2013)
 Bar9 — Brave New World EP (Never Say Die Records, December 2, 2013)
 DKS — Deep End EP (Firepower Records, December 3, 2013)
 Getter — Thriller EP (Firepower Records, December 17, 2013)
Terravita — Rituals (Firepower Records, April 1, 2014)
 Barely Alive — Internet Streets EP (Disciple Recordings & Firepower Records, May 26, 2014)
Bear Grillz — Bear Grillz & Friends, Vol. 1 (Firepower Records, August 5, 2014)
 Protohype — Encore (Firepower Records, August 19, 2014)
Bear Grillz — The Unbearable EP (Firepower Records, January 27, 2015)
 Protohype — Puppy Crew EP (Firepower Records, April 8, 2015)

References

Discographies of Canadian artists
Electronic music discographies